Ahmed Amir (born 18 February 1972) is a Maldivian singer and music composer.

Early life and career
Ahmed Amir was born and raised in the "Amir family" which also includes Ibrahim Amir and Fazeela Amir. Ahmed Amir’s very first appearance in as a music artist was at the age of 11 years, in 1983. He performed as a member of the ‘Pluto Band’ as a vocalist and guitarist. Together with Ahmed Amir, the now well known Maldivian singer Abdul Sameeu had also performed as a member of this Pluto Band.

In 1993, Amir formed  "Maars Studio", which contributed to the music industry in programming music tracks, composing original music and in recording songs. Apart from guiding and training the students on singing techniques, he had also composed music tracks for students who performed in the Interschool Singing Competition. In 1995, Amir was awarded  Gaumee Film Award for Best Background Music for his work in Dheriyaa. His very own music album Fanvaiy released in 2000 consisted of seven original melodies. It was in the year 2000 that Ahmed Amir was awarded Maldivian National Award of Recognition. Ahmed Amir has recorded many songs with his sister Fazeela Amir and was actively involved in music composing and song recordings done in studios for various Dhivehi Song Albums released till 2010.

Discography

Feature film

Television

Non-film songs

Accolades

References 

Living people
People from Malé
1972 births
Maldivian playback singers